The canton of La Vallée des Gaves is an administrative division of the Hautes-Pyrénées department, southwestern France. It was created at the French canton reorganisation which came into effect in March 2015. Its seat is in Argelès-Gazost.

It consists of the following communes:
 
Adast
Agos-Vidalos
Arbéost
Arcizans-Avant
Arcizans-Dessus
Argelès-Gazost
Arras-en-Lavedan
Arrens-Marsous
Artalens-Souin
Aucun
Ayros-Arbouix
Ayzac-Ost
Barèges
Beaucens
Betpouey
Boô-Silhen
Bun
Cauterets
Chèze
Esquièze-Sère
Estaing
Esterre
Ferrières
Gaillagos
Gavarnie-Gèdre
Gez
Grust
Lau-Balagnas
Luz-Saint-Sauveur
Ouzous
Pierrefitte-Nestalas
Préchac
Saint-Pastous
Saint-Savin
Saligos
Salles
Sassis
Sazos
Sère-en-Lavedan
Sers
Sireix
Soulom
Uz
Viella
Vier-Bordes
Viey
Villelongue
Viscos

References

Cantons of Hautes-Pyrénées